The Jamestown Viaduct is part of the northern approach to the Forth Bridge in Scotland. It crosses the hamlet of Jamestown and the village of North Queensferry in Fife.

History

It was constructed between 1887 and 1890, and listed as a Grade B listed building in 2004.

Design

It has four main steel girder spans, supported by three sandstone piers. As well as the four steel spans, there is a stone arch at each end of the viaduct.

The viaduct carries the line crossing the Forth Bridge, from Edinburgh to Aberdeen and the north of Scotland, and carries a significant volume of both passenger and freight rail traffic, which previously included transporting coal to Longannet Power Station prior to its closure in 2016.  there were up to 200 train movements a day and loads of 27 million tonnes annually.

It spans the B981 public road and the former branch railway to North Queensferry and Rosyth. It runs close to and nearly parallel to the A90 road, but the viaduct has a slight curve to the east.

References

External links

Category B listed buildings in Fife
Listed bridges in Scotland
Viaducts in Scotland
Railway bridges in Scotland
Bridges in Fife
Bridges completed in 1890
1890 establishments in Scotland